Dasari Swaroop Kumar (born 7 May 1986) is an Indian cricketer. He made his List A debut for Andhra in the 2008–09 Vijay Hazare Trophy on 21 February 2009. He made his first-class debut on 4 February 2020, for Andhra in the 2019–20 Ranji Trophy.

References

External links
 

1986 births
Living people
Indian cricketers
Andhra cricketers
Cricketers from Vijayawada